Sir William Allan Jamieson PRCPE LLD (1839–1916) was a Scottish physician and academic author. He served as President of the Royal College of Physicians of Edinburgh 1908 to 1910 being succeeded by Sir Byrom Bramwell.

Life

He was born in Dreghorn in Ayrshire on 1 April 1839, the son of John Campbell Jamieson and Mary Young.

In 1903 he was elected a member of the Aesculapian Club. In 1907 he was created a Knight of Grace of the Grand Priory of the Order of the Hospital of St John.
In 1908 he was created Surgeon to the Royal Company of Archers by the King.

He lived at 35 Charlotte Square in Edinburgh (one of Edinburgh's most prestigious addresses) and died there on 21 April 1916. The house now forms part of a hotel.

He is buried in the northern Victorian extension to Dean Cemetery.

Publications
Diseases of the Skin (1901)
The Care of Skin in Health (1912)

Artistic Recognition
He was painted in the uniform of the Royal Company of Archers by Thomas Martine Ronaldson (1881–1942). The portrait hangs in the Royal College of Physicians of Edinburgh. Ronaldson was a neighbour's son, living at 8 Charlotte Square.

References

1839 births
1916 deaths
19th-century Scottish medical doctors
20th-century Scottish medical doctors
Scottish medical writers
Presidents of the Royal College of Physicians of Edinburgh
Alumni of the University of Edinburgh
Scottish non-fiction writers
People from North Ayrshire